Kordofan lark (Mirafra cordofanica) is a species of lark in the family Alaudidae found in Africa.

Taxonomy and systematics
Alternate names for the Kordofan lark include golden lark, Kordofan bush lark and Kordofan singing bushlark.

Distribution and habitat 
The Kordofan lark has a large range that spans the continent from Mauritania and Senegal to Niger, eastern Chad, southern Sudan and northern South Sudan.  Its global extent of occurrence is estimated at 1,900,000 km2.

Its natural habitats are subtropical or tropical dry shrubland and subtropical or tropical dry lowland grassland.

References

Kordofan lark
Birds of the Sahel
Kordofan lark
Taxonomy articles created by Polbot